This is an article on the grading that is used in Finland. Several systems are in use in different educational institutions in Finland.

Comprehensive school 

The "school grade" system has, historically, been a scale of 0 to 10, but all grades lower than 4 have been consolidated into a grade of 4. Thus, it is now divided between a failing grade (4), and 5–10, the passing grades. This is similar to the Romanian grading scale. 
 10 – Excellent, represents about the top 5%
 9 – Very good
 8 – Good
 7 – Satisfactory (average)
 6 – Fair
 5 – Passable
 4 – Failure

In individual exams, but not in the final grades, it is also possible to divide this scale further with '½', which represents a half grade, and '+' and '–', which represent quarter-grades. For example, the order is "9 < 9+ < 9½ < 10– < 10". The grade '10+' can also be awarded for a perfect performance with extra effort by the student, though it is not an official grade.

Upper secondary schools 
Upper secondary schools use the same grades for courses and course exams as comprehensive schools do, but the matriculation examination grades are in Latin. The grading system uses bell curve grading.

The magna cum laude approbatur grade was introduced in 1970 and eximia cum laude approbatur in 1996. Laudatur grades achieved before 1996 are now counted as eximia cum laude approbaturs.

In the grading of Master Theses, there is also non sine laude (N) between lubenter (B) and cum laude (C). Some universities (e.g. University of Turku or University of Helsinki) have switched to grading Master's Theses using the 1–5 grading scale (see below).

Higher education

Universities typically use grading scale from 0 to 5:

As a rule of thumb, passing an examination requires obtaining 50% of the maximum points in the examination. There is almost no grade inflation in Finland and students' grade averages of over 4.0 are rare. In fact, it is not uncommon for an examination to be failed—or passed with grade 1—by most students.

Before Autumn 2005, grades from 0–3 were in use (0 = failed, 3 = very good/excellent) and can be seen in older certificates. Some courses have also been graded on a conditional system of either pass or fail.

Master's theses are typically graded with either the above scale, or by the Latin system used in high school matriculation exams, see above. Contrary to the upper secondary school however, the grade laudatur is typically used very rarely (significantly less than 5% of theses). Indeed, laudatur is often reserved for exceptional students and it is typically awarded for a thesis only once in 5 to 10 years. In practice, eximia is often considered as the best grade available and it best corresponds to a grade of 5 in the 0–5 scale.

Doctoral theses are usually evaluated by pass or fail, although some universities use the Latin system, or the scale from 0 to 5. Some universities award a grade of "pass with distinction" (kiittäen hyväksytty) for the top 10–15% of theses awarded.

References

Finland
Grading
Grading